Sremčica is a suburban settlement within the municipality of Čukarica in the city of Belgrade, 
Serbia.

Location

Sremčica is located south of Belgrade and begins some 2 km south of the southernmost part of the neighborhood of Železnik (though centers of these two settlements are 6-7 kilometers apart). It is a typical road settlement stretched along the central Beogradska street, with many side streets simply being named Beogradska street part 1, 2, etc., but most of them got their own, separate names in 2004–2007. The northern section of the neighborhood makes a separate local community (mesna zajednica), sub-municipal administrative unit, named Gorica but is popularly called Naselje (Serbian for "settlement") by the local population, which numbered 5,358 in 2002. Southern part is organized as a local community with the same name as the entire settlement, Sremčica. Bot local communities were later merged into one.

Demographics

According to the 2011 census results, Sremčica has 21,001 inhabitants. Predominantly a rural settlement, it is one of the fastest growing suburbs of Belgrade since the 1970s. However, its accelerated growth without any planned construction, is not followed by the equal growth of infrastructure, so most parts of Sremčica have some major communal problems (water, sewage, traffic). Despite having population of almost 21,000 inhabitants, only two bus lines (511 and 512) connects it to 20 km away Belgrade.

Geography

Terrain around the settlement is partially made of limestone (karstic micro-region, called Belgrade merokras). One of the best known features in Sremčica is a small pond, Rakina bara, meaning "Raka's pond". It is embedded into the mass wasting area and, typically for the karst lakes, has a sinkhole. Turned into a fish pond and projected as the future recreational area, as the settlement grew, population from the neighboring slopes turned their sewage pipes into the pond which is today covered with reed, turned into a dump and without any fish at all as it almost dried out. The majority of the water is replenished by a local creek.

References

External links

 Official website
 Udruženje za unapređenje Sremčice - udruženje građana

Suburbs of Belgrade
Šumadija
Čukarica